The British Consulate-General, Los Angeles is the United Kingdom's local consulate for Southern California, as well as Arizona, Utah, Hawaii, Nevada, Guam, Northern Mariana Islands, and American Samoa. There is also a Consulate-General in San Francisco. The focus of the consulate is on British investment in the area (the UK is the largest foreign investor in California), as well as assisting British expatriates and tourists in the area.

List of Consuls-General of the United Kingdom to Los Angeles 
 1943–1945: Eric Arthur Cleugh 
 1945: Henry Livingston 
 1945–1947: John Carvell 
 1948–1954: Sir Robert Hadow 
 1954–1957: Sir Michael Gillett 
 1957–1959: Riversdale Stone 
 1959–1964: Sir Herbert Gamble 
 1964–1965: Peter Dalton 
 1966–1974: Albert Franklin 
 1974–1981: Thomas Aston 
 1981–1984: George Finlayson 
 1985–1989: Donald Ballentyne 
 1989–1992: Reginald Holloway 
 1992–1997: Merrick Baker-Bates 
 1997–2001: Paul Dimond 
 2001–2005: Peter Hunt 
 2005–2009: Robert Peirce
 2009–2013: Dame Barbara Hay 
 2013–: Chris O'Connor
 2017–2020: Michael Howells
 2020–Present: Emily Cloke

History 

During the nineteenth century, the British Consulate established deep and extensive ties along the West Coast. Much of the history of Los Angeles is a history of British innovators, from Charlie Chaplin to Raymond Chandler to the architect John Parkinson. Hawaii's first European visitor was Captain James Cook, who died on the Big Island: the Union Jack is part of its state flag, testifying to old British connections there. The post was upgraded from a Consulate to a Consulate-General in 1943.

Residence 
Set in Hancock Park at 450 South June Street, the Residence was designed by Los Angeles architect Wallace Neff, and completed in 1928. It has been the home of successive British Consuls-General since the British Government purchased it in 1957. The Residence is used for many events, all for the purpose of enriching and developing the multifarious connections between Britain and Los Angeles in business, politics, education, culture, science and many other fields of endeavour. The Consul General welcomes several thousand guests to the Residence every year.

References

External links 
British Consulate-General in Los Angeles

Consuls-General, Los Angeles
Los Angeles
United Kingdom